Mary Henrietta Bentley Thomas (December 13, 1845 – February 11, 1923) was an American suffragist. She was president of the Maryland Woman Suffrage Association from 1894 to 1904. She was also president of the Friends Equal Rights Association, and held offices with the National American Woman Suffrage Association (NAWSA).

Early life 
Mary Bentley was born in Maryland, daughter of Richard T. Bentley and Edith D. Bentley. Her family were Quakers. Her grandfather, Caleb Bentley, was a noted silversmith and postmaster.

Career 
Thomas was president of the Maryland Woman Suffrage Association from 1894 to 1904, succeeding the association's founder, Caroline Hallowell Miller. She was in turn succeeded by Emma Maddox Funck. She held offices with the National American Woman Suffrage Association (NAWSA), and spoke at national suffrage conferences. She wrote to the governors of Wyoming, Utah, Idaho, and Colorado, and asked questions about women's suffrage, which was legal in all four states; she published the responses as a broadside. Thomas was also the third president of the Friends Equal Rights Association, and spoke on women's rights at national Quaker gatherings.

Personal life 
Mary Bentley married dairyman Edward Porter Thomas in 1865. They had six children together. She died in 1923, aged 77 years. Her scrapbook of newspaper clippings, in the collection of the Sandy Spring Museum, is available online at Digital Maryland. In 2021, a historical marker was erected in Sandy Spring, Maryland, noting Thomas and Miller's work on woman's suffrage; several of Thomas's descendants attended the marker's unveiling.

References 

1845 births
1923 deaths
American suffragists
American Quakers
People from Sandy Spring, Maryland